Kanchibiya is a constituency of the National Assembly of Zambia. It covers the towns of Chikuni, Kasongo, Katumba, Mpepo, Mulongwa and Ngungwa of Kanchibiya District in Muchinga Province.

List of MPs

References

Constituencies of the National Assembly of Zambia
1991 establishments in Zambia
Constituencies established in 1991